The Pro-Composites Personal Cruiser, also called the Corvair Cruiser, is a single seat, composite homebuilt aircraft.

Design and development
The Personal Cruiser is a single place, low-wing, tricycle gear aircraft with a V-tail.

The composite aircraft is built using the FOLDaPLANE method. The method uses flexible flat composite panels that are radius-bent to form stiff fuselage sections inside a jig. Building time is estimated at 800 hours.

The  Corvair air-cooled four stroke automotive conversion is commonly employed.

Specifications (Personal Cruiser)

See also

References

External links

Video of construction

Homebuilt aircraft
Personal Cruiser
Single-engined tractor aircraft
Low-wing aircraft
V-tail aircraft
2000s United States sport aircraft